XHMSL-FM is an FM radio station located in Los Mochis, Sinaloa, broadcasting on 101.3 MHz.

The station was launched on July 1, 1984, two days after obtaining its concession, making it the first FM station in the city. The original concessionaire was Sandra Luz Pérez Muñoz, part of the Pérez Muñoz family that owns Radiosistema del Noroeste. Its current format is a variety of Spanish and English pop music, and also local news.

XHMSL broadcasts in HD Radio and carries three subchannels, Vintage (HD2), Siempre (HD3, changed from Luz before launch) and El Fuerte sister station XHPFRT-FM La Morrita (HD4). The HD2 and HD3 subchannels were authorized by the Federal Telecommunications Institute on June 6, 2018; the HD4 has no corresponding authorization.

References

External links
 Official Website
 Luz Network Website

Radio stations in Sinaloa
Radio stations established in 1984
Contemporary hit radio stations in Mexico
Mass media in Los Mochis